Cătălin Nicolae (born Bucharest, 22 July 1980) is a Romanian rugby union footballer. He plays as a wing.

Nicolae played for CSA Steaua București (Rugby), Farul Constanţa, but now he plays for Dinamo.

Nicolae has 24 caps for Romania, since his debut in 2003, with 2 tries scored, 10 points in aggregate. He was selected for the 2007 Rugby World Cup, playing a single match in the 14–10 win over Portugal. He also played at the 2011 Rugby World Cup.

External links
Cătălin Nicolae International Statistics

1980 births
Living people
Romanian rugby union players
Romania international rugby union players
Rugby union wings
Rugby union players from Bucharest